Judias V. "Judy" Buenoano (born Judias Welty, also known as Judias Goodyear and Judias Morris; April 4, 1943 – March 30, 1998) was an American serial killer who was executed for the 1971 murder of her husband James Goodyear. She was also convicted for the 1980 murder of her son Michael Buenoano and of the 1983 attempted murder of her boyfriend John Gentry. Buenoano is also acknowledged to have been responsible for the 1978 death of her boyfriend Bobby Joe Morris in Colorado; however, by the time authorities made the connection between Buenoano and Morris, she had already been sentenced to death in the state of Florida.

Buenoano is also believed to have been involved in a 1974 murder in Alabama, and in the 1980 death of her boyfriend Gerald Dossett. After her arrest, Dossett's body was exhumed and analyzed for signs of arsenic poisoning. No charges were laid in that case. Buenoano was the first woman to be executed in Florida since 1848 or electrocuted in USA since 1976.

Early life
Judias Welty was born and raised in Texas, the third of four siblings. Her mother died when she was four, and she was sent along with her baby brother Robert, to live with her grandparents. After her father remarried, they moved to live with him in Roswell, New Mexico. She was reportedly abused by her father and stepmother, who starved her and forced her to work as a slave. When she was fourteen, she spent two months in prison for attacking her father, stepmother and two stepbrothers. Upon being released, she chose to attend reform school in where she graduated in 1960 becoming a nursing assistant. She gave birth to Michael, an illegitimate son the following year.

Crimes
Judy Welty was married to James Goodyear (born December 7, 1933), a sergeant in the U.S. Air Force. He died on September 16, 1971 in Orlando, Florida. His death was initially believed to be due to natural causes. 

In 1973, she moved in with Bobby Joe Morris (born 1939). In January 1978, he died in Trinidad, Colorado by poison. Later that year, she legally changed her name to "Buenoano" (corrupted Spanish for "good year").

In 1979, Buenoano's son Michael (March 30, 1961May 13, 1980) became severely ill, with symptoms including paraplegia. On May 13, 1980, Buenoano took Michael out in a canoe; the canoe rolled, and Michael, weighed down by his arm and leg braces, drowned. Following Michael's death, Buenoano opened a beauty salon.

In 1983, Buenoano was in a relationship with John Gentry. Gentry was severely injured when his car exploded after a friend gathering in Pensacola, Florida. While he was recovering from his injuries, police began to find several discrepancies in Buenoano's background. Further investigation revealed that, in November 1982, she had begun telling her friends that Gentry was suffering from a terminal illness.

"Vitamin pills" which Buenoano had been giving Gentry contained arsenic and paraformaldehyde. Exhumations of Michael Goodyear, James Goodyear, and Bobby Joe Morris showed that all had died of arsenic poisoning. Buenoano received substantial life insurance payouts after each death.

Conviction, imprisonment, and execution
In 1984, Buenoano was convicted for the murder of Michael and the attempted murder of Gentry. In 1985 she was convicted of the murder of James Goodyear. She received a twelve-year sentence for the Gentry case, a life sentence for the Michael Buenoano case, and a death sentence for the James Goodyear case. She was convicted of multiple counts of grand theft (for insurance fraud), and is thought to have committed multiple acts of arson (again, for purposes of insurance fraud).

She was incarcerated in the Florida Department of Corrections Broward Correctional Institution death row for women. On March 30, 1998, Buenoano was executed in the electric chair at the Florida State Prison. Her last meal consisted of broccoli, asparagus, strawberries and hot tea. When asked if she had any last words, Buenoano said "No, sir." Buenoano's body was cremated after her execution.

See also 
 List of people executed in Florida
 List of serial killers in the United States
 List of women executed in the United States since 1976

References

Further reading 

 https://caselaw.findlaw.com/us-11th-circuit/1097413.html

External links
 Entry on Judias Buenoano at the Clark County Prosecutor's official site
 Inmate Release Information Detail - Inmate 160663. Florida Department of Corrections. Retrieved on 2008-05-29.

1943 births
1971 murders in the United States
1980 murders in the United States
1983 crimes in the United States
1998 deaths
20th-century executions by Florida
20th-century executions of American people
American people convicted of attempted murder
American people convicted of fraud
American prisoners sentenced to life imprisonment
Bombers (people)
Executed American female serial killers
Executed people from Texas
Filicides in Florida
Mariticides
Murderers for life insurance money
People convicted of murder by Florida
People executed by Florida by electric chair
People from Quanah, Texas
Poisoners
Prisoners sentenced to life imprisonment by Florida